Ragnar Solberg (30 September 1898 – 9 December 1967) was a Norwegian poet. He was born in Dovre. 
He made his literary debut in 1937 with the poetry collection Is-gud, written in Dovre dialect. Among his other collections are Du fjell from 1938, Livs-skurd from 1950, and Ljos from 1953.

Solberg was running the mountain cabin at Fokstua at Dovrefjell, located by the Dovre Line and close to the Fokstumyra Nature Reserve.

References

1898 births
1967 deaths
People from Dovre
20th-century Norwegian poets
Norwegian male poets
20th-century Norwegian male writers